The Stade el-Massira is a multi-use stadium in Safi, Morocco.  It is currently used mostly for football matches and hosts the home games of Olympique Safi.  The stadium holds 7,000 people.

References

Football venues in Morocco
Buildings and structures in Marrakesh-Safi
Safi, Morocco
Olympic Club de Safi